Daniel Nicolás González Álvarez (born 23 June 1997) is a Uruguayan professional footballer who plays as a forward for Boston River.

Career
González had youth spells with Las Flores and Cerro. He began his senior career with Cerro in 2016. He made his first appearance on 30 August 2016 in a league win away to Fénix. After seven appearances in 2016 for Cerro, González was loaned out to Uruguayan Segunda División team Progreso for the 2017 campaign. He made his first start for Progreso on 22 April versus Cerro Largo, scoring the first goal in a 2–0 win. In his first twenty games for them, González scored ten times. Overall, he went onto score sixteen goals in thirty-one matches, including four goals during the play-offs as Progreso won promotion. He scored his first goals for Cerro in April 2018 against Racing Club and River Plate.

After a year with Defensor Sporting, González moved to River Plate in January 2020.

Personal life
González's brother-in-law, Federico Puente, is a professional footballer.

Career statistics
.

References

External links

1997 births
Living people
Footballers from Montevideo
Uruguayan footballers
Association football forwards
Uruguayan Primera División players
Uruguayan Segunda División players
C.A. Cerro players
C.A. Progreso players
Defensor Sporting players
Club Atlético River Plate (Montevideo) players